Belinda Mayne is a British actress who has appeared in film, television and theatre in Germany, the UK, and the US since 1974 when she made her first appearance in Strangers.

Partial filmography

References

External links
 

English television actresses
English film actresses
1954 births
Living people